Robert Van Mitchell (born April 7, 1955) is a former outfielder in Major League Baseball who played from 1980 to 1983 with the Los Angeles Dodgers and Minnesota Twins.

After his playing days, he was a minor league coach from 1992 to 2005 for minor league affiliates of the Montreal Expos, San Diego Padres, Chicago Cubs, and Anaheim Angels and a roving outfield and baserunning instructor in the farm system of the Boston Red Sox.

In 2006, he became the manager of the Rancho Cucamonga Quakes in the Angels system, and in 2008 he was promoted to skipper of the Triple-A Salt Lake Bees of the Pacific Coast League. In 2015, he was named roving minor league outfield and baserunning coach for the Atlanta Braves. In  he joined the New York Yankees' system as manager of the Double-A Trenton Thunder, and was rehired for  after leading his 2016 club to 87 wins and the Eastern League playoffs. On January 31, 2018, Bobby Mitchell was named the new manager of the Scranton/Wilkes-Barre RailRiders.  In nine years as a minor league pilot, Mitchell has compiled a 517–460 (.529) win–loss record.

Mitchell played in the 1967 Little League World Series for Northridge, California, Little League.

External links

1955 births
Living people
Albuquerque Dukes players
Baseball players from Utah
Clinton Dodgers players
Los Angeles Dodgers players
Major League Baseball second basemen
Minnesota Twins players
Nashville Sounds players
San Antonio Dodgers players
Syracuse Chiefs players
Toledo Mud Hens players
Trenton Thunder managers
USC Trojans baseball players
Alaska Goldpanners of Fairbanks players
Chatsworth High School alumni